The mangar (Luciobarbus esocinus) is a large species of ray-finned fish in the genus Luciobarbus, native to the Tigris–Euphrates river system in Iran, Iraq, Syria and Turkey.

The species is highly prized as a food fish, but it has declined due to overfishing and habitat loss, making it vulnerable. It was well-known even in ancient times and there are illustrations from 1500–1000 BC showing Assyrian priests or deities dressed in the skin of magar.

Description
It is considered one of the largest extant cyprinids (surpassed by the giant barb), and may live for up to at least 17 years. It has a large head, with a toothlees mouth surrounded by four barbels. The silvery body is covered with small scales. There is only one dorsal fin, a pair of pectoral and ventral fins. The anal fin and tail they have yellowish tones.

Distribution, habitat and behavior
The mangar occurs in the drainage basins of the Euphrates and Tigris rivers in Iran, Iraq, Syria, and Turkey. Adults keep to larger bodies of water such as large rivers and reservoir, migrating to smaller inflows to spawn.

The mangar has been recorded feeding on a wide range of animals, from zooplankton and invertebrate to fish and birds, but also phytoplankton. Fish typically make up about half its food.

Conservation
The species is currently classified as Vulnerable by the IUCN. Although no reliable population data are available, reports and catches have declined severely in recent decades, and it is believed that most populations are heavily overfished. Although some locations still show abundant numbers, widespread exploitation as a major target for inland fisheries is considered a cause for concern.

The species has been bred in captivity and is considered to have potential in aquaculture.

References 

Mangar
Fish described in 1843
Taxa named by Johann Jakob Heckel